Aya Sumika is a former American actress best known for her semi-recurring role (which later turned into a regular role) as FBI Agent Liz Warner in the television series Numb3rs.

Personal life
She studied ballet at Juilliard.

Sumika and husband Trevor are high school sweethearts who met when she was 15. They married in 2007. Their daughter, Misa, was born in 2012. Their second daughter, Kiyona, was born in 2014.

Her home is featured in Apartment Therapy House Tour. Sumika and her husband are co-owners of MIDORI Ribbon, a ribbon-oriented fashion and design company featuring Made in America products. MIDORI is located in Los Angeles, CA.

Filmography

References

External links

1980 births
American people of Native Hawaiian descent
American television actresses
Living people
Juilliard School alumni
Actresses from Seattle
Actresses from Miami
American actresses of Japanese descent
21st-century American women